Zoltán Zöld (born 20 August 1979) is a Hungarian former professional footballer who played as a midfielder.

Career
Before the second half of the 1999–2000 season, Zöld signed for Melbourne Knights in the Australian top flight from Ferencváros, Hungary's most successful club, before joining Dandenong Thunder in the Australian lower leagues.

Before the second half of the 2007–08 season, he signed for Austrian lower league team Union Gschwandt from SV Gmunden in the Austrian third division.

References

External links
 

Living people
1979 births
Hungarian footballers
Association football midfielders
Nemzeti Bajnokság I players
National Soccer League (Australia) players
FC Tatabánya players
Fehérvár FC players
Melbourne Knights FC players
Ferencvárosi TC footballers
Hungarian expatriate footballers
Hungarian expatriate sportspeople in Australia
Expatriate soccer players in Australia
Hungarian expatriate sportspeople in Austria
Expatriate footballers in Austria